Our Lives on Wednesdays is the second studio album from the instrumental musical duo I'm Not a Gun. The album's title is based on the circumstances in which the album was recorded. The performers, John Tejada and Takeshi Nishimoto, met on Wednesdays over a five-year period to play music, and the album is the outcome of the sessions.

Track listing
"Walk Through Walls" – 4:44
"Every Moment Is Ours" – 5:15
"Slowly Discovering" – 5:13
"Off in the Distance" – 4:50
"Words Speak and Choose" – 4:55
"Champion" – 5:00
"Sundays Will Never Change" – 5:04
"Scenes of Someone Else" – 5:21
"Never Meant to Be" – 4:28
"Stable Soundwaves" – 4:38

Personnel 
John Tejada – electronics, programming, drums, guitar, bass
Takeshi Nishimoto – guitar, bass

References 

2004 albums
I'm Not a Gun albums